La Motte-d'Aigues is a commune in the Vaucluse department in the Provence-Alpes-Côte d'Azur region in southeastern France.

Geography
La Motte-d'Aigues is situated in the southern part of the Parc naturel régional du Luberon between the crest of the Grand Luberon and the hills bordering the Eze river.

Etymology
Motte is a piece of detached land. Aigue describes something that terminates in a point or has been cut away.
NOTE: that explanation is incorrect. Motte means a mound; aigues is from the Occitan aigas, meaning waters (derived from Latin aquae), as seen in place names like Aigues-mortes and Aigues-vives in the neighbouring prefecture of Gard. Thus La Motte-d'Aigues means the Mound OF Waters, as evinced by its proximity to the Etang (lake) de la Bonde and the River Eze.

See also
 Côtes du Luberon AOC
Communes of the Vaucluse department
Étang de la Bonde

References

Communes of Vaucluse